= Nathan Edgar =

Northern Irish journalist and broadcaster

Nathan Edgar is a journalist from Derry, Northern Ireland. In 2026, he presented and produced the BBC Northern Ireland investigative podcast series Assume Nothing: What Happened to Mary Glasgow?.

== Career ==
Edgar studied journalism at Ulster University and was selected as a Royal Television Society undergraduate bursary scholar in 2022.

In 2024, his documentary On the Edge, about the work of Foyle Search and Rescue in Derry, won the Factual Short Form category at the Royal Television Society Northern Ireland Student Television Awards.

In 2026, Edgar presented Assume Nothing: What Happened to Mary Glasgow?, a six-part investigative series for BBC Northern Ireland examining the 1991 death of nursing assistant Mary Glasgow at Stradreagh Hospital in Derry. Edgar also served as series producer.

The Guardian included the series among its best podcasts of the week in April 2026. Critic Phil Harrison described it as part detective story and part memorial to Glasgow, through contributions from her daughter Emma.

The List also recommended the series.

In August 2026, Edgar was shortlisted for the Gay Byrne Award – Newcomer of the Year at the 2026 IMRO Radio Awards for his work with BBC Radio Ulster.

== Awards and nominations ==
- 2024 – Royal Television Society Northern Ireland Student Television Award, Factual Short Form – On the Edge – Winner
- 2026 – IMRO Radio Awards, Gay Byrne Award – Newcomer of the Year – Nominated
